The Universe was a weekly newspaper for Roman Catholics in the United Kingdom and Ireland, published in Berliner format by the Universe Media Group, with offices at the Guardian Print Centre, Trafford Park, Manchester, England.

History

Founding and early years

The first copies of The Universe were published on Saturday, December 8, 1860, at a cover price of one penny, from 43 Lamb's Conduit Street, London WC. The front page announced that "a cheap Catholic newspaper is required – if only to stay the circulation of anti-Catholic weekly newspapers among Catholic families resident in London".

By selling the paper for just one penny a copy, The Universe said it hoped to be a weekly paper "within the reach of all classes". The Tablet, by comparison, cost 6d.

By 1910, The Universe, now at 1 Racquet Court, Fleet Street, London EC, was giving news from all over the country, not just from London, and had started to produce photographs, mainly portraits of people mentioned in stories.

Belloc–Wells controversy
In the early 1920, the Catholic historian Hilaire Belloc published in "The Universe" a long series of articles sharply criticizing H. G. Wells' historical textbook, The Outline of History. In Belloc's view, Wells' book included "a number of biased statements, intolerant statements and false assumptions" about Christianity in general and the Catholic Church in particular.

Wells responded to Belloc's articles with a series of six of his own, and offered "The Universe" (and other Catholic magazines) the use of them – which was declined – for no payment. Wells responded to the refusal in a letter to The Universe:

 
A month later, the editor of The Universe offered Wells the opportunity of correcting definite points of fact upon which he might have been misrepresented. The editor added the stipulation that Wells would not be allowed to defend his views or examine Belloc's logic. Rather than accept these restrictions, Wells edited his articles and assembled them into a single volume, his Mr. Belloc Objects to "The Outline of History".

Later years
On Thursday 8 December 1960, The Universe, "The Catholic Family Newspaper", celebrated its centenary with a special front colour issue, carrying portraits of Pope Pius IX (1860) and of the much-loved Pope John XXIII, a flashback to the first front page and a fine drawing of St Peter's, Rome. The cover price had increased to 4d and The Universes address was now Universe House, 21 Fleet Street. This edition sold 300,000 copies.

On Friday 6 December 1985, The Universe celebrated its 125th anniversary. The price per copy had risen to 30p and the address was 33–39 Bowling Green Lane, London.

On 7 October 1990, The Universe relocated to Manchester. It was a momentous occasion, not only in moving from Bowling Green Lane to Oxford Street, Manchester, but also in switching from contract typesetters to desktop publishing using Apple Mac computers.

Later, as literary editor of the Catholic weekly newspaper for over 15 years, the ex-Catholic priest "by the name of Piers Compton" (1901–1986) published in 1981 the first edition of the unusual book entitled The Broken Cross: Hidden Hand In The Vatican, and also in PDF format which was withdrawn within weeks of its initial release, catalogued as a reference book and finally reprinted in 1983 shortly before his retirement.

In April 2015, the paper moved its entire operation to the Guardian Print Centre in Manchester, where The Universe moved from a tabloid to The Guardians larger, and very modern, Berliner format. New sections were launched, including a weekly "Around the Parishes" supplement and a "Weekend Companion" pullout of family-centred non-religious news and features.

Joseph Anthony Kelly, who was also the CEO and managing editor of The Universes parent company, The Universe Media Group Ltd., became the newspaper's editor in 1995. He served as editor for 27 years until the paper's closure in June 2021, the second-longest serving editor in the paper's 160 year history.

The Universe Media Group also published The Catholic Times , The Official Catholic Directory of England & Wales, The Catholic Who's Who, Church & Heritage Building Journal, Novena, Vatican: Past and Present, From the Catholic Archives and other third party Catholic titles. In 2010 it was the official publisher and distributor for a number of UK papal visit publications and resources, including Heart to Heart, Welcome Pope Benedict, and the Official Papal Mass Book''. In September 2018 it also published the Official Mass Book for Adoremus, the 2018 National Eucharistic Congress in Liverpool.

The Universe and Catholic Times closed in June 2021 after an unsuccessful appeal for help by Chairman Clive Leach. The Universe Media Group also became insolvent.

References

External links
Pre-liquidation archive of The Universe newspaper website

1860 establishments in the United Kingdom
Publications established in 1860
Catholic newspapers
Publications disestablished in 2021
2021 disestablishments in the United Kingdom